The 2007 UTEP Miners football team represented the University of Texas at El Paso in the 2007 NCAA Division I FBS football season. The team's head coach was Mike Price. The Miners played their home games at the Sun Bowl Stadium in El Paso. UTEP averaged 36,569 fans per game, ranking 64th nationally.

Schedule

Game summaries

New Mexico

Texas Tech

Texas Tech defeated the University of Texas at El Paso, 45-31. Texas Tech got on the scoreboard first when Kobey Lewis rushed up the middle for a one-yard touchdown with Alex Trlica making the point after.

UTEP answered with an eight-yard pass from Trevor Vittatoe to Jeff Moturi for a touchdown. The Miners successfully made the PAT to tie the game. The next score also came from UTEP, giving them the lead on a 41-yard-pass from Vittatoe to Joe West, followed by a point after. UTEP scored a third time before the end of the first quarter. UTEP running back Marcus Thomas, who sat out the previous game because of a suspension, scored on a one-yard-run. Another successfully PAT followed. This gave the Miners a 21-7 lead going into the second quarter.

In the second quarter, the Red Raiders scored first on a pass from Graham Harrell to Michael Crabtree. The Miner's Thomas made another touchdown, bringing the score to 28-14, UTEP, after the successful PAT. Texas Tech scored a field goal as the first half wound to a close.

In the third quarter, the Red Raiders scored twice. First on a nine-yard touchdown pass from Harrell to Crabtree. Then Harrell threw for another touchdown. Both scores were followed by successful extra points by Alex Trlica. The Miners added three points with a field goal, closing out the quarter with a 31-point tie.

Texas Tech defense held UTEP scoreless in the game's final quarter while the offense added 14. Harrell passed to Grant Walker down the middle for an eight-yard touchdown. The successful PAT made it Texas Tech 38, UTEP 31. On the final score, running back Shannon Woods rushed up the middle for a two-yard-touchdown. Texas Tech made the PAT to close the game out with a 45-31 lead.

New Mexico State

Texas Southern

SMU

Tulsa

East Carolina

Houston

Rice

Tulane

Southern Miss

Central Florida

Roster

References

UTEP
UTEP Miners football seasons
UTEP Miners football